Ist or IST may refer to:

Information Science and Technology 
 Bachelor's or Master's degree in Information Science and Technology
 Graduate School / Faculty of Information Science and Technology, Hokkaido University, Japan
 Graduate School of Information Science and Technology, The University of Tokyo, Japan
 IST initiative of Stanford University, USA

Places
 Ist (island), an island in the Adriatic Sea
 Istanbul Airport (IATA code)

Schools and organizations
 Incident Support Team
 Institute of Science and Technology, Austria, IST Austria
 Institute of Science and Technology, Bangladesh, Dhaka
 Institute of Science and Technology, West Bengal, India
 Institute of Space Technology, in Islamabad, Pakistan
 International Socialist Tendency, grouping of Marxist organisations
 Instituto Superior Técnico, school of engineering, University of Lisbon, Portugal
 Institute for Simulation and Training, at the University of Central Florida, US
 International School of Tanganyika, Tanzania
 International School of Toulouse, a school in the south of France
 International Spartacist Tendency
 International School Tripoli
 Penn State College of Information Sciences and Technology, Pennsylvania, USA

Sports 
 IS Tighennif, a football club based in Algeria

Science and technology
 Inappropriate sinus tachycardia, an uncommon type of cardiac arrhythmia
 Interrupt Stack Table, an AMD64 instruction set extension
 InterSwitch Trunk, Avaya enhancement to Link aggregation
 ist, the file extension for files created by the now-obsolete Adobe ImageStyler
 Information and Software Technology, a journal

Mathematics
 Internal set theory, an axiomatic basis for part of non-standard analysis
 Inverse scattering transform, a method for solving some non-linear partial differential equations

Time zones
 Indian Standard Time
 Irish Standard Time
 Israel Standard Time

Other uses
 Ist (band), an English band
 Istriot, a Romance language spoken in Croatia (ISO 639-3 language code ist)
 Toyota ist, a subcompact car made in Japan by Toyota

See also
 Society for Imaging Science and Technology (IS&T), a research and education organization in the field of imaging